Perspectives on Terrorism (PT) is a bimonthly peer-reviewed, open-access online academic journal, covering political violence, terrorism and counter-terrorism, It is published jointly by the Institute of Security and Global Affairs at the Campus The Hague of Leiden University and the Terrorism Research Initiative based in  Vienna, Austria.

History
Perspectives on Terrorism was first published by the Terrorism Research Initiative (TRI) in 2007, the same year of that the organisation was founded, by Robert Wesley, Alex P. Schmid and James J.F. Forest in 2007. The Center for Terrorism and Security Studies (CTSS) was established in 2012 at University of Massachusetts Lowell (UMass Lowell), with Forest as director, and CTSS became co-publisher of the journal.

In August 2016, the journal was co-published by TRI and CTSS; in February 2017 by TRI alone; and from April 2017 (Volume XI, Issue 2) onwards, by TRI and ISGA. At this time, the journal was published under Creative Commons License 3.0, up to and including Vol 12, No 2 in April 2018, after which it moved to its new web page hosted by Leiden University.

Description
The journal publishes research from a wide variety of academics in many different disciplines, including political science, sociology, economics, and statistical science. The publication includes both qualitative and quantitative research on political violence and terrorism, as well as resources for academics. Authors include experienced researchers as well as newcomers to the field, including PhD students. The journal includes articles, research notes, bibliographic resources and reviews. 

The editors-in-chief are James J.F. Forest (of UMass Lowell) and Alex P. Schmid (International Centre for Counter-Terrorism). Robert Wesley was a founding editor.

The journal is available via its website, JSTOR] and DOAJ, being and is open-access and free for use. There are no fees for publication, neither editors nor authors are paid, and the author retains copyright for their work.

Abstracting and indexing
The journal is abstracted and indexed in Scopus (since 2017), JSTOR, and Google Scholar, where it is ranked third in Terrorism Studies journals . 

Its CiteScore  is 1.3, ranking on the 65th percentile in both Law and Political Science and International Relations categories, with clear upwards trend since its 2017 debut on Scopus.

References

External links

Terrorism Research Initiative 
Institute of Security and Global Affairs

Terrorism studies
Publications established in 2007
English-language journals
Creative Commons Attribution-licensed journals
Online-only journals
Bimonthly journals
Political science journals